FC Dynamo-3 Kyiv was a Ukrainian football team based in Kyiv, Ukraine. The team has been featured in the Ukrainian Second League, since it cannot be promoted to the Ukrainian First League, being a junior team from the FC Dynamo Kyiv franchise, which  already has its 2nd tier team (FC Dynamo-2 Kyiv) in the First League.

History
Like most tributary teams, the best players are sent up to the senior team, meanwhile developing other junior players for further call-ups. The team consists of Dynamo's players whose average age is less than 20—In essence the club's future. The players usually progress to this team through the Dynamo Kyiv youth system.

Dynamo-3 Kyiv is withdrawn from the Ukrainian Second League 2008-09 season to allow MFK Mykolaiv reenter the PFL and compete.

League and cup history

{|class="wikitable"
|-bgcolor="#efefef"
! Season
! Div.
! Pos.
! Pl.
! W
! D
! L
! GS
! GA
! P
!Domestic Cup
!colspan=2|Other
!Notes
|-
|align=center|1993–94
|align=center|4th
|align=center bgcolor=tan|3
|align=center|26
|align=center|17
|align=center|6
|align=center|3
|align=center|44
|align=center|13
|align=center|40
|align=center|
|align=center|
|align=center|
|align=center|Group 3
|-
|align=center|1994–95
|align=center|4th
|align=center bgcolor=silver|2
|align=center|30
|align=center|17
|align=center|8
|align=center|5
|align=center|45
|align=center|18
|align=center|59
|align=center|
|align=center|
|align=center|
|align=center|Group 3
|-
|align=center|1995–96
|align=center|5th
|align=center colspan=8|Kyiv Oblast championship
|align=center|
|align=center|
|align=center|
|align=center|
|-
|align=center|1996–97
|align=center|4th
|align=center bgcolor=tan|3
|align=center|16
|align=center|6
|align=center|4
|align=center|6
|align=center|22
|align=center|18
|align=center|22
|align=center|
|align=center|
|align=center|
|align=center bgcolor=green|Promoted
|-
|align=center|1997–98
|align=center|3rd "A"
|align=center bgcolor=silver|2
|align=center|34
|align=center|21
|align=center|7
|align=center|6
|align=center|59
|align=center|24
|align=center|70
|align=center|1/16 finals
|align=center|
|align=center|
|align=center|
|-
|align=center|1998–99
|align=center|3rd "A"
|align=center|5
|align=center|28
|align=center|13
|align=center|7
|align=center|8
|align=center|30
|align=center|26
|align=center|18
|align=center|1/128 finals
|align=center|
|align=center|
|align=center|
|-
|align=center|1999-00
|align=center|3rd "A"
|align=center|9
|align=center|30
|align=center|10
|align=center|11
|align=center|9
|align=center|38
|align=center|26
|align=center|41
|align=center|
|align=center|2L
|align=center|1/8 finals
|align=center|
|-
|align=center|2000–01
|align=center|3rd "A"
|align=center|7
|align=center|30
|align=center|12
|align=center|10
|align=center|8
|align=center|26
|align=center|16
|align=center|46
|align=center|
|align=center|2L
|align=center|1/16 finals
|align=center|
|-
|align=center|2001–02
|align=center|3rd "B"
|align=center|6
|align=center|34
|align=center|16
|align=center|9
|align=center|9
|align=center|48
|align=center|32
|align=center|57
|align=center|
|align=center|
|align=center|
|align=center|
|-
|align=center|2002–03
|align=center|3rd "A"
|align=center|5
|align=center|28
|align=center|14
|align=center|8
|align=center|6
|align=center|30
|align=center|22
|align=center|50
|align=center|
|align=center|
|align=center|
|align=center|
|-
|align=center|2003–04
|align=center|3rd "A"
|align=center|11
|align=center|30
|align=center|9
|align=center|7
|align=center|14
|align=center|26
|align=center|27
|align=center|34
|align=center|
|align=center|
|align=center|
|align=center|
|-
|align=center|2004–05
|align=center|3rd "A"
|align=center|10
|align=center|28
|align=center|9
|align=center|7
|align=center|12
|align=center|31
|align=center|35
|align=center|34
|align=center|
|align=center|
|align=center|
|align=center|
|-
|align=center|2005–06
|align=center|3rd "A"
|align=center|11
|align=center|28
|align=center|7
|align=center|8
|align=center|13
|align=center|17
|align=center|28
|align=center|29
|align=center|
|align=center|
|align=center|
|align=center|
|-
|align=center|2006–07
|align=center|3rd "A"
|align=center|7
|align=center|28
|align=center|5
|align=center|10
|align=center|13
|align=center|29
|align=center|32
|align=center|25
|align=center|
|align=center|
|align=center|
|align=center|
|-
|align=center|2007–08
|align=center|3rd "A"
|align=center|10
|align=center|30
|align=center|9
|align=center|5
|align=center|16
|align=center|30
|align=center|43
|align=center|32
|align=center|
|align=center|
|align=center|
|align=center bgcolor=pink|withdrew
|}

See also
 FC Dynamo Kyiv
 FC Dynamo-2 Kyiv

References

External links
 Website about the team

 
FC Dynamo Kyiv
Dynamo-3 Kyiv, FC
Association football clubs established in 1992
Association football clubs disestablished in 2008
1992 establishments in Ukraine
2008 disestablishments in Ukraine
Dynamo-3 Kyiv
Dynamo-3 Kyiv